Cristian Machado (born July 23, 1974) is a Brazilian-American musician, who is the current vocalist of the American heavy metal musical ensemble Lions at the Gate, is the former vocalist for the nu metal band Ill Niño as well as a featured vocalist in the Roadrunner United project. He has also played in Headclamp and La Familia, in addition to making numerous guest appearances on albums such as Sepultura's Nation, Soulfly's 3 and 40 Below Summer's The Mourning After.

Early life
Cristian Emerson Machado was born in Rio de Janeiro, the son of a musician, but soon moved to Venezuela with his mother. In 1986, they moved to New Jersey where he spent the rest of his teens. He only knew his father, Marcello Machado, halfway through his teenage years. His mother told him his stepfather was his father, and he found out only when his father called him and told him he was his real father. Machado told his father he did not want to see him. Today, however, he communicates with his father through e-mail and phone. Machado is divorced and has a daughter. The two live near his former wife in rural California.

Music
Most of Cristian Machado's music influence is from his childhood without a father and growing up realizing that. Even when touring he would meet people that he felt left an impact on his life and he would show in his music how that person helped or ruined his life.  The songs "Unframed" and "How Can I Live" are both about his father.

Cristian Machado used Dave Williams of Drowning Pool's microphone and stand for several years after Williams' death. They were good friends and both bands created a bond and friendship while doing the Jägermeister tour. After Williams' death during Ozzfest 2002, Drowning Pool and Dave's family gave Machado the mic and stand in respect. In a recent interview, Machado stated "No, I am not using Dave William's microphone stand anymore. I did use it for many years but I am now playing acoustic guitar. He was a beautiful soul and I will always honor him in my heart."

Machado left Ill Niño in 2019. On May 11, 2020, he appeared on Doc Coyle's (Bad Wolves, formerly of God Forbid) podcast, where he spoke about his new solo project which is under his name.

In May 2021, Machado made his return to a band as the vocalist of Lions at the Gate, joined on guitars by former Ill Niño bandmates Ahrue Luster and Diego Verduzco, as well as Stephen Brewer on bass and Fern Lemus on drums.

Discography

Solo 
 Hollywood Y Sycamore (2020)

Lions At The Gate 
 Not Even Human (2021, single)

References 

1974 births
Living people
21st-century Brazilian male singers
21st-century Brazilian singers
Brazilian heavy metal singers
Ill Niño members
Alternative metal musicians
Nu metal singers
Musicians from Rio de Janeiro (city)
Alternative metal bass guitarists
Male bass guitarists
21st-century bass guitarists